was a  heavy cruiser, armed with ten  guns, four  guns, eight tubes for the Type 93 torpedo, and assorted anti-aircraft guns. Chōkai was designed with the Imperial Japanese Navy strategy of the great "Decisive Battle" in mind, and built in 1932 by Mitsubishi's shipyard in Nagasaki.  She was sunk in the Battle off Samar in October 1944. Chōkai was named for Mount Chōkai.

Operational history
At the start of the Pacific War, Chōkai supported the invasion of Malaya and participated in the pursuit of the Royal Navy's battleship Force Z. During January and February 1942, Chōkai was involved in operations to seize the oil-rich Dutch East Indies and the island of Borneo. Steaming near Cape St. Jacques, Chōkai struck a reef, sustaining hull damage on 22 February 1942. On  27 February, she reached Singapore for repairs.

After repairs, Chōkai was once again assigned to a support role in an invasion, this time the landings at Iri, Sumatra, and the invasion of the Andaman Islands and the seizure of Port Blair a few days later. Afterwards, Chōkai sailed to Mergui, Burma.

On 1 April 1942, Chōkai left Mergui to participate in Operation C, a raid on merchant shipping in the Indian Ocean. First, Chōkai torpedoed and sank the U.S. freighter Bienville, and later on, the British steamship Ganges on 6 April. With her role in the operation successfully concluded, Chōkai returned to Yokosuka on 22 April 1942.

The Guadalcanal campaign

By mid-July 1942, Chōkai was made the new flagship of Vice Admiral Mikawa Gunichi and his 8th Fleet. She proceeded towards Rabaul. On 7 August 1942, with Guadalcanal having been invaded by the Americans, Chōkai headed for the Guadalcanal waters, with Vice Admiral Mikawa aboard. In the battle of Savo Island, Mikawa's squadron of heavy cruisers inflicted a devastating defeat on an Allied squadron, sinking four heavy cruisers (three American and one Australian) and damaging other ships. Chōkai returned to Rabaul for temporary repairs. For the rest of the Solomon Islands campaign, Chōkai would fight in an assortment of night battles with the U.S. Navy, sustaining varied, but mostly minor, damage.

Subsequent action
Relieved as the Eighth Fleet flagship shortly after the final evacuation of Guadalcanal, Chōkai headed back to Yokosuka on 20 February 1943. All four ships took part in the Battle of the Philippine Sea.

Battle of Leyte Gulf
CruDiv 4 was part of Admiral Takeo Kurita's large fleet of IJN battleships, cruisers, and destroyers that took part in the various engagements of the Battle of Leyte Gulf at the Philippines.

Chōkai was then transferred to Cruiser Division Five, where she survived an air attack on 24 October 1944, while the battleship Musashi was sunk.

Sunk in the battle off Samar
On the morning of 25 October, Chōkai engaged an American force of escort carriers, destroyers, and destroyer escorts in the Battle off Samar. During her approach to the US escort carriers, Chōkai was hit several times on the port side amidships by 5"/38 caliber guns of this force's escort carriers and destroyers. It was believed at the time that one of these hits may have set off the eight deck-mounted Japanese Type 93 "Long Lance" torpedoes; however, 's expedition in 2019 found Chōkais torpedoes still intact. An explosion was observed aboard Chōkai before a TBM Avenger from Kitkun Bay dropped a 500 lb (230 kg) bomb on her forward machinery room. Fires began to rage and she went dead in the water. She was scuttled later that day by torpedoes from the destroyer  , which also rescued some of her crew. Two days later Fujinami was itself sunk with the loss of all hands, including the Chōkai survivors.

Wreck
RV Petrel discovered the wreck of  Chōkai on 5 May 2019 and dived it via ROV on 30 May 2019.

References

Bibliography

Takao-class cruisers
Ships built by Mitsubishi Heavy Industries
1932 ships
World War II cruisers of Japan
World War II shipwrecks in the Philippine Sea
Cruisers sunk by aircraft
Warships lost in combat with all hands
Maritime incidents in October 1944
Ships sunk by US aircraft
2019 archaeological discoveries